Pyrrhopappus carolinianus, commonly called Carolina desert-chicory, or Texas dandelion is in the genus Pyrrhopappus of the family Asteraceae, native throughout Eastern and South Eastern United States. It is an annual found in mostly open grasslands and wet roadsides. P. carolinianus can bloom from spring to frost with the heads facing the sun throughout the day. ”

Description 
Pyrrhopappus carolinianus can have more than one erect, flowering stem that can grow up to 50 cm. in length.  The leaves are deeply lobed 5-15 cm. long.  The smaller upper leaves are slightly indented.  The yellow flowers can be up to 3.75 cm. in width.  Because it is in the family Asteraceae, it has rays and disc flowers, both of which are yellow.

Pollination 
The oligolectic bee, Hemihalictus spp., have been found to be the pollinators for the Carolina desert-chicory. ”

References 

Cichorieae